Jess Miller (August 26, 1884 – December 11, 1965) was a Wisconsin politician.

Born in Eagle, Wisconsin, in Richland County, Wisconsin, Miller was a realtor and auctioneer. He held a number of local political offices; in 1938, Miller was elected to the Wisconsin State Senate, serving until 1965.

Notes

1884 births
1965 deaths
People from Richland County, Wisconsin
Wisconsin state senators
20th-century American politicians